Monk and Nun is a style of roof similar to imbrex and tegula, but instead of using a flat tile (tegula) and an arched tile (imbrex), two arched imbrex tiles are used.

The top linking tiles are the monk tiles and the lower layer are the nun tiles. Mortar is often used under the monk tile to firmly attach it to the nun tile as well as providing an extra seal against entry of rain, but it is sometimes omitted. The origin of the name is unknown, but is also known as Priependach.

This style of roof was, along with imbrex and tegula, developed in ancient times, and is popular around the Mediterranean, France, and, during the Middle Ages it was also popular in Germanic Europe, but was later replaced by Biberschwanz ("beaver tail") roofing, although is still occasionally used, particularly for old and sacred buildings (which would have originally had Monk and Nun roofs).

In modern times this style is popular in the American southwest where it is called Pan and Cover or Mission Style. An easier-to-install variant called S-Tile is essentially the synthesis of a pan tile and a cover tile.

Gallery

References

Roof tiles
Terracotta
Ancient Roman pottery
Ancient Roman architectural elements
Roofing materials
Ceramics of medieval Europe